Dor Jan (born 16 December 1994) is an Israeli professional footballer who plays as a forward for Hapoel Jerusalem.

Early life
Jan was born in Rishon LeZion, Israel, to a Jewish family.

Playing career
Jan made his professional debut with Maccabi Tel Aviv in a 4-3 Israeli Premier League loss to Bnei Yehuda on 9 May 2012. After a series of loan, Jan signed with Bnei Yehuda on 29 July 2018. On 5 October 2020, Jan signed with Paços de Ferreira in the Portuguese Primeira Liga.

Honours
Maccabi Tel Aviv
Israeli Premier League: 2012–13, 2013–14

Bnei Yehuda
Israel State Cup: 2018–19

References

External links

1994 births
Living people
Israeli Jews
Israeli footballers
Footballers from Rishon LeZion
Maccabi Tel Aviv F.C. players
Hapoel Ironi Kiryat Shmona F.C. players
Hapoel Petah Tikva F.C. players
Hapoel Acre F.C. players
Beitar Tel Aviv Bat Yam F.C. players
F.C. Ashdod players
Bnei Yehuda Tel Aviv F.C. players
F.C. Paços de Ferreira players
Maccabi Petah Tikva F.C. players
Hapoel Jerusalem F.C. players
Israeli Premier League players
Liga Leumit players
Primeira Liga players
Israeli expatriate footballers
Expatriate footballers in Portugal
Israeli expatriate sportspeople in Portugal
Association football forwards